The 24th Alaska State Legislature served during 2005 and 2006.  9 members of the Alaska Senate were elected on November 5, 2002.  The remaining senators and all members of the Alaska House of Representatives were elected on November 2, 2004.

Sessions
1st session: January 10, 2005 – May 10, 2005
1st special session: May 11, 2005 – May 25, 2005
2nd session: January 9, 2006 – May 9, 2006
2nd special session: May 10, 2006 – June 8, 2006

Alaska Senate

Make-up

Members

Leadership
Senate President: Ben Stevens (R-Anchorage)
Senate Majority Leader: Gary Stevens (R-Kodiak)
Senate Minority Leader: Johnny Ellis (D-Anchorage)

Committee assignments
Committee on Committees
Ben Stevens (chair), Cowdery, Gary Stevens, Ellis, Hoffman
Community & Regional Affairs
Gary Stevens (chair), Stedman, Wagoner, Ellis, Kookesh
Finance
Green (co-chair), Wilken (co-chair), Bunde (vice-chair), Dyson, Stedman, Hoffman, Olson
Health, Education & Social Services
Dyson (chair), Wilken (vice-chair), Green, Elton, Olson
Judiciary
Seekins (chair), Huggins (vice-chair), Therriault, French, Guess
Labor & Commerce
Bunde (chair), Seekins (vice-chair), Ben Stevens, Davis, Ellis
Resources
Wagoner (chair), Seekins (vice-chair), Dyson, Ben Stevens, Stedman, Elton, Guess
Rules
Cowdery (chair), Ben Stevens, Gary Stevens, Ellis, Kookesh
State Affairs
Therriault (chair), Wagoner (vice-chair), Huggins, Davis, Elton
Transportation
Huggins (chair), Cowdery (vice-chair), Therriault, French, Kookesh

Alaska House of Representatives

Make-up

Members

Leadership
Speaker of the House: John Harris (R-Valdez)
House Majority Leader: John Coghill, Jr. (R-North Pole)
House Minority Leader: Ethan Berkowitz (D-Anchorage)

Committee assignments
Committee on Committees
Harris (chair), Chenault, Coghill, Meyer, Rokeberg, Berkowitz, Kerttula
Community & Regional Affairs
Olson (co-chair), Thomas (co-chair), LeDoux, Kott, Neuman, Cissna, Salmon
Finance
Chenault (co-chair), Meyer (co-chair), Stoltze (vice-chair), Foster, Hawker, Holm, Kelly, Weyrauch, Croft, Joule, Moses
Health, Education & Social Services
Wilson (chair), Seaton (vice-chair), Anderson, Kohring, McGuire, Cissna, Gardner
Judiciary
McGuire (chair), Anderson (vice-chair), Coghill, Dahlstrom, Kott, Gara, Gruenberg
Labor & Commerce
Anderson (chair), Kott (vice-chair), LeDoux, Lynn, Rokeberg, Crawford, Guttenberg
Resources
Ramras (co-chair), Samuels (co-chair), Elkins, Gatto, LeDoux, Olson, Seaton, Crawford, Kapsner
Rules
Rokeberg (chair), Coghill (vice-chair), Harris, Kohring, McGuire, Berkowitz, Kerttula
State Affairs
Seaton (chair), Gatto (vice-chair), Elkins, Lynn, Ramras, Gardner, Gruenberg
Transportation
Elkins (co-chair), Gatto (co-chair), Kohring, Neuman, Thomas, Kapsner, Salmon

See also
List of Alaska State Legislatures
 23rd Alaska State Legislature, the legislature preceding this one
25th Alaska State Legislature, the legislature following this one
 List of governors of Alaska
 List of speakers of the Alaska House of Representatives
 Alaska Legislature
 Alaska Senate
 {AKLeg.gov}

Notes

External links
Alaska Legislature home page (current legislature, not archive)
Alaska Senate home page (current legislature, not archive)
Alaska House of Representatives home page (current legislature, not archive)
House and Senate Majority's website archive for the 24th Legislature

2005 establishments in Alaska
Alaska
2006 in Alaska
Alaska
2007 disestablishments in Alaska
Alaska legislative sessions